Gina Mitten (born November 1, 1963) is an American politician who served in the Missouri House of Representatives from the 83rd district from 2013 to 2021.

References

1963 births
21st-century American politicians
Living people
Democratic Party members of the Missouri House of Representatives
Women state legislators in Missouri
21st-century American women politicians